The 1952 Bulgarian Cup Final was the 12th final of the Bulgarian Cup (in this period the tournament was named Cup of the Soviet Army), and was contested between Slavia Sofia and Spartak Sofia on 9 November 1952 at People's Army Stadium in Sofia. Slavia won the final 3–1.

Route to the Final

Match

Details

See also
1952 A Group

References

Bulgarian Cup finals
PFC Slavia Sofia matches
Cup Final